The Parnawa Voivodeship  was a unit of administrative division and local government in the Duchy of Livonia, part of the Polish–Lithuanian Commonwealth, since it was formed in 1598 until the Swedish conquest of Livonia in the 1620s. The seat of the voivode was Parnawa (Pärnu).

The voivodeship was created by King Zygmunt III Waza, and it was based on the Parnawa Presidency, created by King Stefan Batory in 1582, after the Truce of Yam-Zapolsky. It effectively ceased to exist in 1621, but officially, Parnawa Voivodeship existed until the Treaty of Oliva (1660). Its main towns were: Parnawa, Felin, Wolmar, Karkus, Salis, Lemsal, and Helme.

The title of Voivode of Parnawa, as well as other local titles, remained in use until the Partitions of Poland. It was one of the so-called fictitious titles (Polish: urzad fikcyjny).

Titular voivodes
The voivodes of Dorpat Voivodeship.

1.Ernst Magnus Dönhoff
2.Piotr Tryzna
3.Jan Zawadzki
4.Gothard Tyzenhaus
5.Henryk Doenhoff

References

Voivodeships of the Polish–Lithuanian Commonwealth
Historical regions in Estonia
History of Pärnu
Geography of Pärnu
16th century in Estonia
17th century in Estonia
18th century in Estonia
Duchy of Livonia
1598 establishments in the Polish–Lithuanian Commonwealth
1621 disestablishments in the Polish–Lithuanian Commonwealth
States and territories disestablished in the 1620s
Organisations based in Livonia